Michael John "Mickey" Walker, Jr. (born 10 April 1945) is an English former professional footballer and coach.

Early and personal life
Walker was born in Harrogate, and grew up in Doncaster. His father Mickey Sr. had played for Doncaster Rovers, Bradford City, Bradford Park Avenue and York City. As a teenager he played cricket, trialling for Yorkshire Schoolboys at the age of 15, and later playing for England Schoolboys.

He is married to Carol.

Career

Playing career
After being told he was too short (at 5 ft 7) to play football by Doncaster Rovers, Walker played youth football with Sheffield Wednesday and Rotherham United. After a spell in non-league football with Bourne Town, he turned professional with Bradford City in October 1964. He made 20 appearances in the Football League (scoring 1 goal) for Bradford City, before returning to Rotherham United in March 1966. He then moved to Sligo Rovers in Ireland later in 1966.

He spent the 1968 season with the Los Angeles Wolves of the North American Soccer League, scoring 7 goals in 22 games.

He later played for Mansfield Town, Altrincham, Stockport County, Chesterfield and Macclesfield Town.

Coaching career
Walker worked as a scout for Liverpool and Rangers, and as a youth team coach at Leeds United and Nottingham Forest. After leaving his role as Assistant Manager at Nottingham Forest, Walker has held a number of positions at Doncaster Rovers, including Assistant Manager, Director of Football, and Caretaker Manager. He was Director of Football at Doncaster from 2006 until July 2012 when he was released as part of the club's cost cutting restructuring after relegation from the Championship.

A testimonial match was held by Doncaster Rovers on 1 August 2009 in honour of Walker.

Sources

References

External links

1945 births
Living people
English footballers
Sheffield Wednesday F.C. players
Rotherham United F.C. players
Bourne Town F.C. players
Bradford City A.F.C. players
Sligo Rovers F.C. players
Los Angeles Wolves players
Mansfield Town F.C. players
Altrincham F.C. players
Stockport County F.C. players
Chesterfield F.C. players
Macclesfield Town F.C. players
English Football League players
League of Ireland players
North American Soccer League (1968–1984) players
Association football wingers
English expatriate footballers
English expatriate sportspeople in Ireland
Expatriate association footballers in the Republic of Ireland
English expatriate sportspeople in the United States
Expatriate soccer players in the United States
English football managers
Liverpool F.C. non-playing staff
Rangers F.C. non-playing staff
Leeds United F.C. non-playing staff
Nottingham Forest F.C. non-playing staff
Doncaster Rovers F.C. non-playing staff
Doncaster Rovers F.C. managers